Willis David Gradison Jr. (born December 28, 1928) is an American politician from Ohio who served in the United States House of Representatives from 1975 to 1993.

Early life and education

Gradison, a Republican, was born in Cincinnati, Ohio and received a bachelor of arts degree from Yale University in 1949, a master's degree in business administration from Harvard University's Graduate School of Business Administration in 1951, and a doctor of commercial science degree from the Harvard Business School in 1954.

Career in banking and politics

Gradison worked as an investment broker and then served as assistant to the undersecretary of the treasury (1953–1955), and assistant to the secretary of health, education, and welfare (1955–1957).

He was then elected to the Cincinnati city council, on which he served from 1961 to 1974. This service included a term as mayor of Cincinnati in 1971 (a position that at the time rotated among council members). Gradison was first elected to the U.S. House of Representatives in 1974 and began serving in 1975 (94th Congress). He was the first Jewish Representative elected to the U.S. Congress from Ohio. He began representing Ohio's District 1, but after the 1980 census, he and Tom Luken effectively switched districts, with Gradison's district renumbered as District 2. He served until 1993, when he resigned to accept the position of president of the Health Insurance Association of America.

1980s tax legislation

The 1981, 1984, and 1986 tax acts and the 1983 Social Security act were some of the most important legislation initiated by the Ways and Means Committee during the 1980s.

Economic Recovery Tax Act of 1981
In Congress, "Bill" was a member of the U.S. House Ways and Means Committee, during the 95th through the 101st U.S. Congress, and was closely involved in many successful legislative efforts. One effort was the original sponsorship of the bill providing the income tax indexing clause that was later inserted into President Reagan's famous tax reduction bill of 1981, called The Economic Recovery Tax Act of 1981. This indexing made it so that income tax brackets would automatically be moved up as the inflation rate rose, so that "bracket creep" would be avoided, whereby income tax rates rise only because of inflation, not because of a rise in deflated income levels. This addition to the 1981 tax bill was very popular, as indicated by its co-sponsorship by a majority of members of the U.S. House of Representatives (sponsorship by a majority of members indicates the bill would be passed if put up for a vote on the House floor).

Indexing of taxes became a part of a substitute tax bill, backed by President Reagan in a July 27, 1981 evening address to the nation, and known as the Conable-Hance Substitute Tax Bill, H.R. 4260. Instead of the one year tax cut bill sponsored by Ways and Means Chairman Dan Rostenkowski, or the two-year tax cut bill sponsored by the Senate Finance Committee Chair Bob Dole, the substitute bill was a three-year 25 percent tax cut, with federal estate tax relief and the indexing of tax rates to prevent bracket creep beginning in 1985. And this substitute bill became The Economic Recovery Tax Act of 1981. It was followed by years of widespread tax elusion efforts which eventually triggered legislative countermeasures.

Social Security Reform Act of 1983 
Gradison also served as ranking Republican of the Ways and Means Subcommittee on Social Security during the Social Security system reform of the early 1980s, and in particular when the Social Security Reform Act of 1983 was passed into law. Included in the 1983 reform act were provisions that Gradison had originated as U.S. Bills. One such provision mandated the computerization of the death certificates of Social Security beneficiaries in order to avoid fraudulent continued payment of benefits when the beneficiary was already deceased. And another such provision included in the 1983 reform act, which was first introduced by Gradison as a U.S. House Bill, was to place the Social Security Trust Funds "off-budget", out of the general Treasury revenue budget, in order to avoid politicizing the reform process of the Social Security system.

Tax Reform Act of 1984
Bill Gradison was also involved in the next major tax reform effort, of 1984. He sponsored a bill that clarified how non-statutory fringe benefits should be treated by the Internal Revenue Service (IRS), in terms of how the IRS should issue regulations on fringe benefits. At the time this was so controversial that Congress had initiated several consecutive moratoriums on the IRS that prohibited them from issuing such fringe benefit regulations. This Congressional clarification of what non-statutory fringe benefits should be taxed, through regulations written by the IRS, was passed into law as a major part of The Tax Reform Act of 1984. It included measures such as the granting of specific tax exemptions for many commonly used fringe benefits.

Tax Reform Act of 1986
Gradison was also involved in parts of the 1986 tax reform legislation. He requested a study by the Joint Committee on Taxation on how far corporate tax rates could be reduced, in a revenue neutral fashion, if the 10% investment tax credit were eliminated. They reported that the top corporate tax rate could fall from 46% to 39%, while eliminating the investment tax credit, and still keep total revenue unchanged. This elimination of the 10% investment tax credit was then included in both the House and Senate versions of the bills that became the Tax Reform Act of 1986, which reduced top corporate tax rates to 34%.

Positions after Congress
The vacancy in the House of Representatives created by Gradison's 1993 resignation was filled by a special election, which was won by fellow Republican U.S. Rep. Robert J. Portman.

In 2002, Gradison was appointed by the Securities and Exchange Commission as a founding Member of the Public Company Accounting Oversight Board (PCAOB); this Board was created by the Sarbanes-Oxley Act of 2002. Gradison was unanimously reappointed to a full five-year term in August 2004, and served as Acting Chairman from December 2005 to July 2006. He remained a PCAOB Board member until February 2011. He was named commissioner of the Medicare Payment Advisory Commission (MedPAC), which is an independent Congressional agency established by the Balanced Budget Act of 1997 (P.L. 105-33) to advise the U.S. Congress on issues affecting the Medicare program. He served as a MedPAC commissioner for six years. MedPAC's biography of Gradison cites his previous experience as a member of the Health Subcommittee of the Committee on Ways and Means; his Vice Chairmanship of the U.S. Bipartisan Commission on Comprehensive Health Care (“Pepper Commission”); his service as Assistant to the Secretary of Health, Education, and Welfare; and his Vice Chairmanship of the Commonwealth Fund Task Force on Academic Health Centers.

As of 2022, he serves on the board of directors of the Committee for a Responsible Federal Budget.

See also 
 List of Jewish members of the United States Congress
 List of United States representatives from Ohio

References

External links

|-

|-

|-

1928 births
Cincinnati City Council members
Harvard Business School alumni
Jewish American people in Ohio politics
Jewish mayors of places in the United States
Jewish members of the United States House of Representatives
Living people
Mayors of Cincinnati
Yale University alumni
Republican Party members of the United States House of Representatives from Ohio
21st-century American Jews